Andrei Shefer (born July 26, 1981) is a Russian professional ice hockey defenceman who is currently an unrestricted free agent. He most recently played for HC Severstal of the Kontinental Hockey League (KHL). He was selected by the Los Angeles Kings in the 2nd round (43rd overall) of the 1999 NHL Entry Draft after making his professional debut with Severstal Cherepovets in the Russian Superleague.

After just seven games in the 2016–17 season, his 14th with Severstal, Shefer's contract was mutually terminated on September 22, 2016.

References

External links

1981 births
Living people
HC CSKA Moscow players
Halifax Mooseheads players
Los Angeles Kings draft picks
Severstal Cherepovets players
SKA Saint Petersburg players
HC Spartak Moscow players
HC Yugra players
Russian ice hockey defencemen